

Whyalla-Cowleds Landing Aquatic Reserve is a marine protected area in the Australian state of South Australia located in the waters of Spencer Gulf adjoining the east coast of Eyre Peninsula.
It was declared in 1984 to protect "the mangrove-seagrass communities and associated fish nursery areas".

Since 2012, it has been located within the boundaries of a 'sanctuary zone' in the Upper Spencer Gulf Marine Park.

The aquatic reserve is classified as an IUCN Category II protected area.

See also
Protected areas of South Australia

References

External links
Entry for Whyalla-Cowled's Landing Aquatic Reserve on the Protected Planet website

Aquatic reserves of South Australia
Protected areas established in 1984  
1984 establishments in Australia
Spencer Gulf
Whyalla